Sergey Demyashkevich (born 28 August 1966) is a Belarusian former wrestler who competed in the 1992 Summer Olympics.

References

1966 births
Living people
Belarusian male sport wrestlers
Olympic wrestlers of the Unified Team
Wrestlers at the 1992 Summer Olympics
Soviet male sport wrestlers
Olympic bronze medalists for the Unified Team
Olympic medalists in wrestling
World Wrestling Championships medalists
Medalists at the 1992 Summer Olympics
Sportspeople from Minsk
21st-century Belarusian people
20th-century Belarusian people